Abang Abdul Rahman Zohari Abang Openg formed the second Abang Johari cabinet after being invited by Abdul Taib Mahmud to begin a new government following the victory in the 18 December 2021 general election in the state of Sarawak, Malaysia. In order to be the Premier, Abang Johari was immediately sworn in before the Yang di-Pertua Negeri Sarawak on the same day that night. Prior to the election, Abang Johari led (as Premier) the first Abang Johari cabinet, a coalition government that consisted of members of the component parties of Gabungan Parti Sarawak (previously it was the Sarawak Barisan Nasional-led cabinet).

The new Cabinet line-up was announced by Abang Johari on 30 December 2021. The ministers and deputy ministers were then sworn in before the governor on 4 January 2022.

Composition

Ministers

Deputy Ministers

References 

Politics of Sarawak